Petter Pettersson Jr. (19 May 1911 – 9 October 1984) was a Norwegian politician for the Conservative Party.

He served as a deputy representative to the Norwegian Parliament from Møre og Romsdal during the terms 1954–1957, 1961–1965, 1965–1969 and 1969–1973.

References

1911 births
1984 deaths
Deputy members of the Storting
Conservative Party (Norway) politicians
Møre og Romsdal politicians